Frankie Leon Neal (born October 1, 1965) is an American former college and professional football player who was a wide receiver in the National Football League (NFL) for a single season in 1987.  Neal played college football for the University of Florida and Fort Hays State University, and thereafter, he played professionally for the Green Bay Packers of the NFL. He is currently serving a 30 year prison sentence in the Florida Department of Corrections for numerous drug charges.

Early years 

Neal was born in Sebring, Florida.  He attended Okeechobee High School in Okeechobee, Florida, where he played high school football for the Okeechobee Brahmans.

College career 

Neal attended the University of Florida in Gainesville, Florida, where he played for coach Charley Pell and coach Galen Hall's Florida Gators football teams from 1983 to 1985.  Memorably, Neal was part of one of the ten greatest pass plays in Gators football history when he caught a pass from quarterback Kerwin Bell to go eighty-two yards from scrimmage for a touchdown against the Florida State Seminoles in 1985.  He finished the 1985 season with twenty receptions for 487 yards, which is still the Gators' single-season record for most yards per catch (24.4 yards).

Professional career 

The Green Bay Packers selected Neal in the third round of the 1987 NFL Draft, and he played for the Packers during the  season.  He finished his rookie season as a pro with thirty-six receptions for 420 yards and three touchdowns.

See also 

 Florida Gators football, 1980–89
 List of Fort Hays State Tigers in the NFL Draft
 List of Green Bay Packers players

References 

1965 births
Living people
People from Sebring, Florida
Players of American football from Florida
American football wide receivers
Florida Gators football players
Fort Hays State Tigers football players
Green Bay Packers players
Okeechobee High School alumni